Trypoxylon clavicerum is a Palearctic species of solitary wasp.

References

External links
Images representing Trypoxylon clavicerum

Hymenoptera of Europe
Crabronidae
Insects described in 1828
Taxa named by Amédée Louis Michel le Peletier
Taxa named by Jean Guillaume Audinet-Serville